Landmarks of Britain is a series of silver bullion coins produced by the Royal Mint in the United Kingdom. The first coin was released in 2017 and features a design of Big Ben previously used on a £100 coin released in 2015.
The second and third coins, both released in 2018, feature Tower Bridge and Trafalgar Square.  The next coin is expected to portray Buckingham Palace. The coin has a maximum mintage of 50,000. The same designs appeared on a four coin proof set in 2014, these had trichromatic colour-printing and had a mintage of only 3,500 sets.

References

External links

List of British banknotes and coins
Coins of the pound sterling
Bullion coins
Silver as an investment

Coins of the United Kingdom
Silver coins
Bullion coins